The 2021 Monza Formula 2 round was the fifth round of the 2021 Formula 2 Championship and took place at the Monza Circuit from 10 to 12 September. It ran in support of the 2021 Italian Grand Prix and featured three races.

Classification

Qualifying

Sprint race 1

Sprint race 2

Feature Race 

Note:
 – Richard Verschoor originally finished seventh, but was later disqualified after it was found that the combined weight of his MP Motorsport car, including the driver wearing his complete racing apparel, was below the minimum weight specified in Article 5.a of the Technical Regulations.

Standings after the event 

Drivers' Championship standings

Teams' Championship standings

 Note: Only the top five positions are included for both sets of standings.

See also 
2021 Italian Grand Prix

References

External links 
 

Monza
Monza Formula 2
Monza Formula 2